The 1991 Albanian Supercup was the third edition of the Albanian Supercup, an annual Albanian football match. The match was contested by Flamurtari Vlorë, champions of the 1990–91 Albanian Superliga, and Partizani Tirana, winners of the 1990–91 Albanian Cup. It was held at the Qemal Stafa Stadium on 11 January 1992.

Flamurtari Vlorë won the match 1–0 thanks to the winner of Viktor Daullja, thus clinching their second ever title.

Match details

See also
 1990–91 Albanian Superliga
 1990–91 Albanian Cup

References

1991
Supercup
Albanian Supercup, 1991
Albanian Supercup, 1991